Treaty of Dresden may refer to
the Treaty of Dresden (1699), a Saxo-Danish alliance during the Great Northern War
the Treaty of Dresden (1709), a treaty re-establishing the Saxo-Danish alliance during the Great Northern War
the Treaty of Dresden (1745), ending the Second Silesian War

See also
Dresden Coinage Convention (1838)